The 2011–12 season was the 107th overall season of football and the 74th season of competitive professional football in France.

The men's French national team began play on 10 August 2011 contesting a friendly match against Chile. The team continued its qualification matches for UEFA Euro 2012. The men's youth international teams also began playing qualification matches for their yearly European Championship tournament. Les Espoirs began its qualification campaign for the 2013 UEFA European Under-21 Football Championship, while the under-19 and under-17 teams played qualification matches for the 2011 UEFA European Under-19 Football Championship and 2011 UEFA European Under-17 Football Championship, respectively. Similarly, the women began their qualification campaign for UEFA Women's Euro 2013.

News

Coupe de France final date change

In February 2011, it was reported by the French media that the French Football Federation had scheduled the 2011–12 edition of the Coupe de France final to be played on 5 May 2012. The date is significant because it would mark the 20th anniversary of the Furiani disaster, which occurred when a tribune at the Stade Armand Cesari in Furiani collapse during a Coupe de France semi-final match between Bastia and Marseille. The tragedy resulted in the death of 18 individuals and injuries to over 2,000. The resulting outcry and criticism of the decision to schedule the final on that date led to the Federation issuing a statement declaring that the official calendar for the competition had not been released, so the reports were only rumors. On 31 March 2011, the schedule was released and the date for the final was set for 28 April 2012.

Supercup in Morocco

On 15 April 2011, the Ligue de Football Professionnel announced that, for the third consecutive season, the Trophée des champions will be held on international soil. The match will be played in Tanger, Morocco at the recently completed Stade de Tanger and will be contested by the winner of Ligue 1 and the winner of the Coupe de France. The match will be played on either 27 July 2011. Like the previous two years, the idea will be to promote French football abroad, but this time more specifically in Africa and the Arab world.

New FFF president 

On 18 June 2011, following an election, Federal Council member Noël Le Graët was named as the federation's 12th president after winning almost 55% of the vote. Le Graët defeated the incumbent Fernand Duchaussoy and third candidate Eric Thomas, the former receiving 45% of the vote, while the latter took in only .19% of the vote.

DNCG rulings

Ligue 2 

On 1 July 2011, following a preliminary review of each club's administrative and financial accounts in the Championnat National, the DNCG ruled that Tours would be relegated to the Championnat National. Tours president, Frédéric Sebag, confirmed the demotion was as a result of the club's failure to "balance its books". Sebag also confirmed that the club would be appealing the ruling. On 13 July, Tours successfully appealed to the DNCG and was, subsequently, reinstated into Ligue 2.

National 

On 26 May 2011, following a preliminary review of each club's administrative and financial accounts in the Championnat National, the DNCG ruled that Pacy Vallée-d'Eure, Strasbourg, Gap, Grenoble, and Cannes would be relegated to the Championnat de France amateur after the organization determined that the club's were enduring financial difficulties. The clubs had the option to appeal the ruling. On 24 June 2011, Pacy Vallée-d'Eure officials confirmed in a press conference that it would accept its relegation to the fourth division in an effort to smooth over its €350,000 debt into next year. Two weeks later, Grenoble confirmed on its website that the Appeals Board of the DNCG had informed club officials that it will be relegated to the fourth division. Grenoble, subsequently, entered liquidation on 7 July. On 13 July, Grenoble's relegation was validated after the French Football Federation confirmed via letter to SAS Épinal that the club would be replacing Grenoble in the Championnat National.

On 8 July 2011, the Appeals Board of the DNCG confirmed that both Strasbourg and Gap would remain relegated after the clubs failed to convince the board of its intent to fix its financial liabilities. Strasbourg has a deficit of over €4 million, while Gap's debt has exceeded over €80,000. Following the appeal denial, Gap officials announced that the club would appeal to the CNOSF, the National Sporting Committee of France. On 18 July, despite both clubs still having the option to appeal the DNCG rulings, the Ligue du Football Amateur (LFA) announced that Red Star and Cherbourg would replace Strasbourg and Gap, respectively, for the 2011–12 edition of the Championnat National. On the following day, Cannes had its appeal to remain in the Championnat National rejected by the DNCG. Similar to Gap, following the decision, Cannes announced its intent to appeal the ruling at the CNOSF. On 29 July, the CNOSF gave a favorable ruling for Cannes recommending to the federation that Cannes should remain in the third division. On 3 August, the CNOSF ruled Gap confirmed the demotion of Gap to the Championnat de France amateur. The French Football Federation determined whether Cannes would be allowed to participate in the league on 4 August, one day before the season was set to begin at the federation's annual executive meeting. At the meeting, the Federation re-affirmed its decision to relegate Cannes to the CFA stating it "trust the DNCG and followed its decisions".

CFA 

On 26 May 2011, following a preliminary review of each club's administrative and financial accounts in the Championnat National, the DNCG ruled that Pacy Vallée-d'Eure, Strasbourg, Gap, Grenoble, and Cannes would be relegated to the Championnat de France amateur (CFA) after the organization determined that the clubs were enduring financial difficulties. The organization also excluded Toulon from participating in the CFA and relegated both Agde and Chambéry to the fifth division. On 4 June, the DNCG announced that, for the second consecutive season, Calais would not be allowed to ascend to the CFA. All clubs had the option to appeal the rulings.

On 24 June 2011, Pacy Vallée-d'Eure officials confirmed in a press conference that it would accept its relegation to the fourth division in an effort to smooth over its €350,000 debt into next year. Two weeks later, on 4 July, Grenoble confirmed on its website that the Appeals Board of the DNCG had informed club officials that it will be relegated to the fourth division. Grenoble, subsequently, entered liquidation on 7 July, which made the club unable to participate in the CFA. On the same day as the Grenoble ruling, the DNCG also rejected the appeals of Toulon and Calais. On 8 July 2011, the Appeals Board of the DNCG confirmed that both Strasbourg and Gap would remain relegated after the clubs failed to convince the board of its intent to fix its financial liabilities. Strasbourg has a deficit of over €4 million, while Gap's debt has exceeded over €80,000. Following the appeal denial, Gap officials announced that the club would appeal to the CNOSF, the National Sporting Committee of France. On 13 July, Agde successfully appealed to the DNCG and was, subsequently, re-instated into the CFA, while Chambéry had its appeal rejected.

On 19 July, Cannes had its appeal to remain in the Championnat National rejected by the DNCG. Similar to Gap, following the decision, Cannes announced its intent to appeal the ruling at the CNOSF. On 29 July, the CNOSF gave a favorable ruling for Cannes recommending to the federation that Cannes should remain in the third division. On 3 August, the CNOSF ruled Gap confirmed the demotion of Gap to the Championnat de France amateur. The French Football Federation determined whether Cannes would be allowed to participate in the league on 4 August, one day before the season was set to begin at the federation's annual executive meeting. At the meeting, the Federation re-affirmed its decision to relegate Cannes to the CFA stating it "trust the DNCG and followed its decisions".

Promotion and relegation

Men

Women

Managerial changes

Ligue 1

Ligue 2

National

Ownership changes

Ligue 1

Ligue 2

Transfers

Competitions

International competitions

Men's

Women's

National teams

Men's senior 
Friendly

UEFA Euro 2012 qualification

Friendly

UEFA Euro 2012

Women's senior 
Friendly

UEFA Women's Euro 2013 qualification

Friendly

2012 Cyprus Cup

UEFA Women's Euro 2013 qualification

Friendly

2012 Summer Olympics

Last updated: 9 August 2012Source: French Football Federation

France U-21 
2013 UEFA European Under-21 Football Championship qualification

Friendly

2013 UEFA European Under-21 Football Championship qualification

Friendly

2013 UEFA European Under-21 Football Championship qualification

Last updated: 8 June 2012  Source: French Football Federation U-21 Schedule

France U-20 
Friendly

2012 Toulon Tournament

Last updated: 1 June 2012Source: French Football Federation U-20 Schedule

France U-19 
Friendly

Tournoi de Limoges

Friendly

Porto Tournament

2012 UEFA European Under-19 Football Championship Elite Round qualification

2012 UEFA European Under-19 Football Championship

Last updated: 12 July 2012  Source: French Football Federation U-19 Schedule

France U-18 
Czech Republic Tournament

Friendly

Last updated: 24 May 2012  Source: French Football Federation

France U-17 
Friendly

2012 UEFA European Under-17 Football Championship First Round qualification

2012 Algarve Cup

2012 UEFA European Under-17 Football Championship Elite Round qualification

2012 UEFA European Under-17 Football Championship

Last updated: 10 May 2012  Source: French Football Federation U-17 Schedule

France U-16 
Friendly

2011 Tournoi du Val-de-Marne

2011 Nike International Tournament

2012 Aegean Cup

Friendly

2012 Montaigu Tournament

Friendly

Last updated: 30 May 2012Source: French Football Federation U-16 Schedule

Notes

References

External links 
 Official site

 
Seasons in French football